Thomas Martin Kennerly (January 24, 1874 – July 29, 1962) was a United States district judge of the United States District Court for the Southern District of Texas.

Education and career 

Born in Lee County, Texas, Kennerly read law to enter the bar in 1893. He was in private practice in Giddings, Texas from 1893 to 1897 and in Houston, Texas from 1897 to 1931. He was a Referee in Bankruptcy for the United States District Court for the Southern District of Texas from 1903 to 1906. He was a special state district judge for Harris County, Texas in 1918.

Federal judicial service

On January 24, 1931, Kennerly was nominated by President Herbert Hoover to a seat on the United States District Court for the Southern District of Texas vacated by Judge Joseph Chappell Hutcheson Jr. Kennerly was confirmed by the United States Senate on February 4, 1931, and received his commission on February 7, 1931. He assumed senior status on August 29, 1954, serving in that capacity until his death on July 29, 1962 in Houston.

References

Sources
 

1874 births
1962 deaths
Judges of the United States District Court for the Southern District of Texas
United States district court judges appointed by Herbert Hoover
20th-century American judges
United States federal judges admitted to the practice of law by reading law
People from Giddings, Texas